Kelvinhaugh is a rural locality in the Toowoomba Region, Queensland, Australia.

Geography 
The Oakey–Cooyar Road runs along the western boundary.

History 
Mayburn Provisional School opened on 20 January 1905. On 1 January 1909, it became Mayburn State School. On 30 July 1926, it was renamed Kelvinhaugh State School. It closed on 30 October 1952. It was at 133 Wilthorn Kelvinhaugh Road.

The Wilthorn railway station was on the north-east corner of the Oakey Cooyar Road and the Wilthorn Kelvinhaugh Road. It was on the former Cooyar railway line.

References

Further reading 

  — includes Gowrie Little Plains School, Aubigny School, Crosshill School, Devon Park State School, Silverleigh State School, Boodua School, Greenwood State School, Kelvinhaugh State School

Toowoomba Region
Localities in Queensland